Camille Thoman is an English director and writer best known for her 2017 thriller Never Here, starring Mireille Enos and Sam Shepard. Her documentary The Longest Game premiered on PBS in May 2018 . Thoman's solo performance pieces have been performed by her at The Young Vic in London and broadcast on the BBC.

Early career  
Thoman began her career doing physical theatre in the UK. Her solo performances pieces toured the UK and were performed at The Young Vic in London, Battersea Arts Center, The Rondo in Bath, The Unity Theatre in Liverpool and the Komedia in Brighton. She also took her work to the Edinburgh Fringe Festival where her devised piece Numb received a Total Theatre Award Nomination. Numb was also featured on the BBC program Edinburgh nights. In 2006 she made her short film Falling Objects, starring Golden Globe nominee Mireille Enos, Oscar-winner Timothy Hutton, Oscar-winner Melissa Leo and Mad Men's Kevin Rahm.

Never Here  
Never Here is a 2017 thriller about an artist who photographs strangers. When disturbing events lead her to suspect that someone is watching her, boundaries blur between crime and art, the watcher and the watched. Never Here stars Mireille Enos, Sam Shepard, Vincent Piazza, Goran Visnjic, Nina Arianda and Desmin Borges. Never Here was released in the US in October 2017.

Filmography  

 5 Flights Up (short, 2003)
 Sunday Morning (short, 2006)
 Falling Objects (short, 2006)
 The Longest Game (documentary, 2017)
 Never Here  (2017)

Awards 
 Grand Jury Prize for Best Documentary, Woods Hole Film Festival [The Longest Game]
 Grand Jury Prize for Best Documentary, Grand Rapids Film Festival [The Longest Game]
 Grand Jury Prize for Best Documentary, Sunscreen Film Festival [The Longest Game]
 Grand Jury Prize for Best Documentary,  Gasparilla Film Festival [The Longest Game]

References

General
https://www.growingbolder.com/camille-thoman-0-740092/

Living people
Year of birth missing (living people)
American film directors